Faristenia jumbongae is a moth in the family Gelechiidae. It is found in Korea and Japan.

The wingspan is 12–14.5 mm. The forewings are brownish orange, with creamy white scales before the middle and beyond the costal patch, as well as several short dark streaks throughout. The hindwings are grey.

References

Faristenia
Moths described in 1993